Bedkihal  is a village in the southern state of Karnataka, India. It is located in the Nippani taluk of Belgaum district in Karnataka. Bedkihal it is famous for "Shree Siddheshwar" festival in Dasara every year. During dasara festival the main attraction is the Shee Siddeshwara Palaki procession which starts in the afternoon on the day of Bedkihal dasara from Shree Siddeshwara temple and will be taken through the village yatra and Palaki reaches temple on the next day morning. There are many events will be organized every year like Kabbaddi, Marathon, Volley ball, Rangoli, Kusti at Siddeshwara Kusti ground where the likes of Karthik Kate, Bala Rafiq shaik, Nithin Madane, Mauli Jamadade and many Indian wrestlers have participated. To add to the glory of Bedkihal Kusti last year two Russian wrestlers also participated in Bedkihal Kusti. As soon as Ghatstapana starts entire village will be decorated with beautiful lights which will make every person mesmerized. In the night view of the village looks beautiful.

Madhalawada or MadhalaKilla or Inamdar Killa or Inamdarwada:
Coordinates : 16°32’8″N   74°29’9″E

Demographics
 India census, Bedkihal had a population of 9560 with 4965 males and 4595 females.

Software Company- The Bedkihal

References

External links
 http://Belgaum.nic.in/
 https://bedkihal.com/

Villages in Belagavi district